Acanthochela is a genus of mites in the family Haemogamasidae.

Species
 Acanthochela chilensis Ewing, 1933

References

Mesostigmata